Isaac Hoffman House is a historic home located at Houcksville, Carroll County, Maryland, United States. It was built about 1850 and is a two-story gable-roofed stuccoed stone farm house with a four bay façade with a one-story full length porch.  Also on the property is a stone springhouse. The house is unusual for retaining elements of Pennsylvania German architecture at such a late date.

The Isaac Hoffman House was listed on the National Register of Historic Places in 1985.

References

External links
, including photo from 2006, at Maryland Historical Trust

Houses on the National Register of Historic Places in Maryland
Houses in Carroll County, Maryland
Houses completed in 1850
Pennsylvania Dutch culture in Maryland
National Register of Historic Places in Carroll County, Maryland